United Nations Security Council Resolution 133, adopted unanimously on January 26, 1960, after examining the application of the Republic of Cameroon for membership in the United Nations, the Council recommended to the General Assembly that the Republic of Cameroon be admitted.

See also
List of United Nations Security Council Resolutions 101 to 200 (1953–1965)

References
Text of the Resolution at undocs.org

External links
 

 0133
Political history of Cameroon
1960 in Cameroon
Foreign relations of Cameroon
 0133
 0133
January 1960 events